Manoj Manzil is an Indian politician from Bihar. He represented the CPIML Liberation in Tejashwi Yadav's Mahagathbandhan alliance during the 2020 Bihar Legislative Assembly Election. Manzil has concentrated his political activity in Agiaon and has been organizing the Sadak Par School Movement in Bhojpur. He received 84,777 votes, 61.51% of total vote share, and was elected as the MLA from Agiaon in 2020.

History 
Manzil was born in 1984 or 1985 to a family of landless Dalit labourers and brick kiln workers. His father was a cadre of the CPI(ML) and his uncle spent his life as part of the Jay Prakash movement. Eventually he managed to get into college in Arrah and taught students to make ends meet, but was several times forced to drop out. He then became a Left activist. In 2015, he contested the elections from Agiaon as a CPI(ML)-L candidate but was jailed and came in third place.

In 2018, he organized the Sadak Par School movement in Bhojpur district, where he and other cadres would teach students on the road to protest abysmal primary schooling in rural Bihar. The movement gained significant media attention and in response the government made several school reforms. His activism has resulted in his being slapped with over 30 FIRs. In 2020, he contested the elections again and won a majority. During the second wave of COVID-19 in India, Manoj Manzil was widely appreciated for his efforts to help the community in and around the hospitals in his constituency.

References 

Bihari politicians
Communist Party of India (Marxist–Leninist) Liberation politicians
Bihar MLAs 2020–2025
Living people
1984 births